Bis(trifluoromethanesulfonyl)aniline is the organic compound with the formula C6H5N(SO2CF3)2. It is a white solid. The compound is used to install the triflyl group (SO2CF3). Its behavior is akin to that of triflic anhydride, but milder.

See also
 Comins' reagent, a related triflating reagent.

References

Triflates
Amides
Reagents for organic chemistry
Phenyl compounds